The 2018 24H Series may refer to:

 2018 24H GT Series
 2018 24H TCE Series
 2018 24H Proto Series